The Roman Catholic Diocese of Sanggau is a diocese located in the city of Sanggau in the Ecclesiastical province of Pontianak in Indonesia.

History
 9 April 1968: Established as the Apostolic Prefecture of Sekadau from the Metropolitan Archdiocese of Pontianak and Diocese of Ketapang
 8 June 1982: Promoted as Diocese of Sanggau

Leadership
 Bishops of Sanggau (Roman rite)
 Bishop Valentinus Saeng, C.P. (18 June 2022 – present)
 Bishop Giulio Mencuccini, C.P. (22 January 1990 – 18 June 2022)
 Prefects Apostolic of Sekadau (Roman Rite)
 Fr. Domenico Luca Spinosi, C.P. (1 September 1972 – 1982)
 Fr. Michael Di Simone, C.P. (31 July 1968 – 1972)

References
 GCatholic.org
 Catholic Hierarchy

Roman Catholic dioceses in Indonesia
Christian organizations established in 1968
Roman Catholic dioceses and prelatures established in the 20th century